Pycnoporellus is a genus of fungi in the family Fomitopsidaceae. The widespread genus, circumscribed by American mycologist William Alphonso Murrill in 1905, contains two species.

References

Polyporales genera
Fomitopsidaceae
Taxa named by William Alphonso Murrill
Taxa described in 1905